The Damned United is a 2009 British-American sports drama film directed by Tom Hooper and adapted by Peter Morgan from David Peace's bestselling 2006 novel The Damned Utd – a largely fictional book based on the author's interpretation of Brian Clough's ill-fated tenure as football manager of Leeds United in 1974.

Originally proposed by Stephen Frears, he pulled out of the project in November 2007, and Hooper took over. Filming took place from May to July 2008. Marking the fifth collaboration between screenwriter Peter Morgan and actor Michael Sheen, who plays Clough, the film was released in the United Kingdom on 27 March 2009 and in North America on 25 September.

Despite controversy due to the film's numerous historical inaccuracies and its poor performance at the box office, The Damned United received critical acclaim upon release, with particular praise given for Sheen's performance. It received numerous award nominations including the British Independent Film Award for Best Supporting Actor, the ALFS Award for British Supporting Actor of the Year, the Satellite Award for Best Actor in a Motion Picture, Drama and Best Actor in a Supporting Role and the Writers' Guild of Great Britain Award for Best Feature Film Screenplay.

Plot
After failing to qualify for the 1974 FIFA World Cup, England manager Alf Ramsey is replaced by Don Revie (Colm Meaney), the highly successful manager of Leeds United. Revie's replacement at Leeds is Brian Clough (Michael Sheen), the former manager of Derby County and a fierce critic of Leeds because of their violent and physical style of play under Revie's management. Furthermore, Clough's long-time assistant, Peter Taylor (Timothy Spall), has not joined him.

The roots of Clough's conflict with Leeds are depicted as happening in a 1968 FA Cup match between Leeds, the leaders of the First Division and Derby, who were struggling near the bottom of the Second Division. Clough assumed Revie to be a similar man to himself, as they grew up in the same part of Middlesbrough and both played for Sunderland, and made many preparations for the match. However, on the day of the match, Revie failed to even acknowledge Clough upon entering the Baseball Ground. Derby eventually lost 2–0. Although Clough initially blames the brutality of the Leeds players, he and Taylor recognise that their side are not good on a technical level. So they sign veteran Dave Mackay (Brian McCardie), along with several other young players. Chairman Sam Longson (Jim Broadbent) is extremely anxious about the investment, as well as the fact that Clough did not consult him before signing Mackay. However, in 1969 Derby are promoted, but in their first league game against Leeds they lose 5–0. The club win their first ever League championship in 1972, meaning a European Cup campaign the following year. They go through to the semi-finals against Juventus. Unfortunately, against Longson's advice, Clough uses his best squad in the last match before the semi-final, against Leeds, purely out of pride and determination to beat Revie. They suffer injuries and Billy Bremner (Stephen Graham) sarcastically wishes Clough well for the semi-final. Juventus defeat them 3-1, and Clough publicly lambasts Longson.

Taylor then suffers a heart attack, and Clough tries to secure his position by offering his and Taylor's resignations in a protest against the chairman's unwillingness to fund further signings. He is outraged when the directors accept their resignations and ban them from entering the Baseball Ground again (although Clough later sneaks in as a supporter). Derby fans' protests raise Clough's hopes of being reinstated, and he is backed by the majority of his players as well, but former player Dave Mackay is appointed manager instead. Derby fans quickly lose interest and Clough loses all hope of getting his job back. He and Taylor are then offered jobs at Brighton & Hove Albion. They agree to take the jobs after taking an all-expenses-paid holiday in Majorca. During the holiday that summer, Clough agrees to take control of Leeds after being approached by their representative. Taylor, however, argues the case for staying at Brighton, and after a bitter quarrel, the two go their separate ways.

Back in the storyline's "present”: Clough alienates his players in their first training session, first by accusing them of winning all of their awards by cheating, and then making them start with a 7-a-side game as if they were schoolchildren. When Bremner protests that Revie never made them do this, Clough reminds them that he is not Revie and threatens a severe punishment for any player who mentions the former manager's name or methods again.

The season starts with a Charity Shield match against FA Cup winners Liverpool at Wembley, which is widely anticipated as both the final match of Liverpool manager Bill Shankly and Clough's debut as Leeds manager. Unfortunately, the event is marred when the Leeds captain Billy Bremner gets into a fight with Kevin Keegan. Both are sent off, and in turn throw their shirts off and walk off the pitch bare-chested in defiance. Leeds lose the match, and Bremner is given a two-month suspension from football, forcing Leeds to start the season without their influential captain. As a result, Leeds suffer a horrendous start to the season and are in danger of relegation only one season after winning the title. After Bremner and the players air their grievances to the board, the club terminates Clough's contract after just 44 days - though he forces them to pay an enormous severance package. Afterwards, Clough agrees to do a final interview with Yorkshire Television, but finds Revie there to confront him, bringing the two face-to-face at last. Clough accuses Revie of being 'cold-hearted' and 'fundamentally dishonest', both as a person and a football manager, and Revie in turn brands Clough as 'inflexible and egocentric'. Clough brings up the incident in the 1968 FA Cup, and Revie claims to have not known who the rookie manager was at the time (a doubtful claim considering that Revie was known for meticulously researching every opponent his team faced). After the interview, Clough drives down to Brighton to patch things up with Taylor. It involves Clough literally getting on his knees, grovelling at Taylor's dictation, and they are reconciled.

In the film's epilogue, the audience is told that Don Revie "failed as England manager", and afterwards never worked in football in his home country again, spending the rest of his career working in the Middle East, where he was accused of financial mismanagement. Brian Clough and Peter Taylor, meanwhile, reunited at the "small, provincial club" Nottingham Forest, where they repeated their prior achievements with Derby by helping them win promotion to the First Division and then winning the title. They went on to better both Revie and their own spell at Derby by winning two European Cups in succession, in 1979 and 1980. The film ends with the caption: "Brian Clough remains the greatest manager the England team never had."

Cast
{{castlist|
Michael Sheen as Brian Clough
Timothy Spall as Peter Taylor
Colm Meaney as Don Revie
Jim Broadbent as Sam Longson
Andy Graham as Terry Cooper
Maurice Roëves as Jimmy Gordon
Elizabeth Carling as Barbara Clough
Oliver Stokes as Nigel Clough
Ryan Day as Simon Clough
Peter Quinn as Bob Matthewson
Henry Goodman as Manny Cussins
Jimmy Reddington as Keith Archer
Liam Thomas as Les Cocker
Danny Tomlinson as David Harvey
Lesley Maylett as Paul Reaney
Chris Moore as Paul Madeley
John Savage as Gordon McQueen
Mark Cameron as Norman Hunter
Tom Ramsbottom as Trevor Cherry
Matthew Storton as Peter Lorimer
Peter McDonald as Johnny Giles
Stephen Graham as Billy Bremner
Bill Bradshaw as Terry Yorath
Stuart Gray as Eddie Gray
Alex Harker as Allan Clarke
Craig Williams as Joe Jordan
Joe Dempsie as Duncan McKenzie
Brian McCardie as Dave Mackay
Martin Compston as John O'Hare
Colin Harris as John McGovern
Giles Alderson as Colin Todd
Stewart Robertson as Archie Gemmill
Laurie Rea as Terry Hennessey
Tomasz Kocinski as Roy McFarland
Mark Bazeley as Austin Mitchell
Elliot Stroud as solicitor 
Mark Jameson as head groundsman
David Stevenson as reporter
Nathan Head as reporter
Chris Wilson as FA disciplinary committee chairman
Ralph Ineson as a crazy wild-haired reporter
William Martyn Conboy as Key reporter, Revie departure scene
John Craven as himself
Tony Gubba as himself
Jimmy Hill as himself
Paul Bown as Mike Bamber
Barry Davies as himself (uncredited)
David Coleman as himself (uncredited)
}}

Production
Development
In 2006, Stephen Frears read The Damned Utd while travelling to the Venice Film Festival. He enjoyed the book and talked with The Queen producer Andy Harries about it. He then sent it to Peter Morgan, with whom he also worked on The Queen, on the eve of that film's premiere in Venice; Morgan read it by the next morning. Morgan enjoyed it, stating, "It deals with themes I love: Alcoholism and self-destruction and psychotic male competitiveness and treachery." Development of the project continued through February 2007, when BBC Films executive producer Christine Langan, another producer of The Queen, became involved. Frears had Michael Sheen in mind for Clough right from the start. Sheen had appeared in three other Frears projects: Mary Reilly, The Deal and The Queen. He was chosen because of his physical resemblance to Clough. When Frears suggested to Sheen that he play the part, Sheen "rolled his eyes and burst into a wonderful impersonation" of Clough. Sheen said Clough was "one of those people who's decided he's going to shape the rest of the world in his image. Inevitably there's something in us that recognises that that's playing with fire and the gods will have to strike you down."

With Frears as director, principal photography was scheduled for the end of 2007. He pulled out of the film in November, stating that he could not work out the logistics of the film and that he had "set out in pursuit of something that was leading him down a blind alley". Tom Hooper, who directed Morgan's Longford, replaced him. Hooper researched Clough by reading Duncan Hamilton's Provided You Don't Kiss Me, an award-winning biography of Clough. He also planned to meet Clough's family and some of the Leeds players during Clough's tenure. Casting continued through to May 2008. In April, Colm Meaney, Timothy Spall and Jim Broadbent were announced as Don Revie, Peter Taylor and Sam Longson respectively. During pre-production, Langan had viewed archive footage of Clough and Revie and considered whether Revie should be played by an actor much older than Sheen; despite being 47 in the footage, Revie "could pass for 60". Before Meaney was cast, the younger Kenneth Branagh had been considered. Non-league Garforth Town A.F.C. held auditions for non-speaking football players on 14 May. Auditionees were expected to have played in the Northern Counties East League, Northern Premier League, or higher. Casting for extras took place on 20 and 21 May.

Filming

Principal photography ran from 25 May to 2 July at locations in Yorkshire, Derbyshire and Majorca. Chesterfield F.C.'s Saltergate stood in for Wembley Stadium, the Baseball Ground, Carrow Road, and Bloomfield Road. Saltergate was chosen because it had not undergone any significant structural modifications since the 1970s, though some repainting work was done by the production team to differentiate the grounds from each other. The car park outside Elland Road was dressed to look like the Leeds training ground (until the move to the training facilities at Thorp Arch in the early 1990s, Leeds United's training ground was indeed located right next to the stadium). Other locations used in Leeds include Headingley Stadium, the former site of Cookridge Hospital, and a linen hire firm in Armley. The recreations of the television interviews (based on those conducted on the regional news show Calendar) were filmed at the same location as the originals, these being the Yorkshire Television Studios in Kirkstall Road, Leeds. Further exteriors scenes were shot in Armley, Beeston and Adel. The training ground used by Derby County was the quarry football pitch which is nearby to the Elland Road Stadium.

The former Bradford Central Police Station on The Tyrls in Bradford city centre, was used for the interiors of the Elland Road board room, players' lounge and manager's office. The building was demolished in 2015.

During the week of 23 June, filming took place in Scarborough, in place of Brighton. Interior scenes were filmed in the Victoria Sea View Hotel and the Esplanade Hotel. Exteriors were filmed on the Queens Parade and at nearby Scalby Mills. Computer-generated imagery was added in post-production to make Scarborough look like Brighton. The Royal Hotel in Scarborough was also used. Filming then moved on to Saddleworth before concluding in Majorca.

Release
The first television trailer premiered on Setanta Sports 1 on 23 January 2009 before the kick-off of the FA Cup Fourth Round tie between Derby County and Nottingham Forest. The distribution rights were originally pre-sold by Ealing Studios International to Optimum Releasing. Sony Pictures Entertainment made a higher offer to the production companies and would distribute the film worldwide. It was released in the UK on 27 March 2009. A gala screening of the film was held at the 2009 Toronto International Film Festival in September 2009, the film went on a limited release in the United States on 9 October that year.

Box office
The film earned a total of US$3,604,339 in the UK and Republic of Ireland, and in Canada and the US, it earned US$441,264; the worldwide box office take was US$4,045,603.

Reception
Critical responseThe Damned United was acclaimed by film critics. On the review aggregator Rotten Tomatoes, the film has an approval rating of 92% based on 121 reviews, with an average rating of 7.5/10. The website's critical consensus reads, "Better than your average football pic, Damned United is carried by another star turn from Michael Sheen as Brian Clough." Metacritic assigned the film a weighted average score of 81 out of 100, based on 27 critics, indicating "universal acclaim".

Roger Ebert of the Chicago Sun-Times gave the film three and a half stars out of four, and praised Sheen for portraying "modern British icons so uncannily that he's all but disappeared into them". Peter Bradshaw of The Guardian gave the film four stars out of five, calling it "fresh, intelligent... [and] terrifically involving", and also praised Sheen and Meaney's performances. Empire's reviewer William Thomas awarded The Damned United'' three stars out of five. He praised the film for "capturing the emotional toil of football", although added that it "struggles to find its stride".

Prior to its release, Clough's widow Barbara, already a critic of Peace's book, expressed disappointment that the film was being made at all. The Clough family declined an invitation to a preview of the film, affirming their opposition to the entire project. Clough's son Nigel said he did not intend to watch the film and that those in football who had seen it had told him it bore "no resemblance" to what actually happened. Sony's decision to release the film six days after what would have been Clough's 74th birthday was also criticised.

Producer Andy Harries responded to the Clough family's criticisms by stating that "The filmmakers' goal is to tell a wonderful and extraordinary story with universal themes of success, jealousy and betrayal". Harries added that without adding fictional elements the film would not have been as exciting to watch. He also reassured Clough's family that the film would be a more sympathetic portrayal of Clough than in the book. Writer Peter Morgan claimed that he did not feel the film's accuracy was of major importance.

Historical accuracy
Dave Mackay sued Left Bank Pictures over his portrayal in the film, angered at the implication that he had betrayed Clough in taking the Derby manager's job. Martin O'Neill, who played for Mackay at Nottingham Forest before his departure to manage Derby, suggested that the film falsely implied Dave Mackay was still a player at Derby County when becoming manager of the club, whilst also questioning the portrayal of the relationship between Clough and Peter Taylor, though he praised the performance of the actors, particularly that of Sheen. In March 2010, Mackay won an apology and undisclosed damages from Left Bank Pictures. Roy McFarland agreed with Mackay's decision to take legal action and said that he enjoyed Sheen's performance, but otherwise "did not particularly like the film".

The publishers of the novel had already been successfully sued by Irish midfielder and former Leeds player Johnny Giles. He wrote: "Many of the things Peace talks about in the book never happened and, for that reason, I felt it necessary to go to the courts to establish that this was fiction based on fact and nothing more."

BBC Sport journalist Pat Murphy, a personal friend of Clough, noted 17 factual inaccuracies in the film, including various errors regarding the timing of events. He particularly dismissed as "absolute nonsense" a scene where Clough stays in the Derby dressing room during a match against Leeds, too nervous to watch.

In the film it is shown that three signings are made by Clough at once, those of Dave Mackay, John McGovern and John O’Hare. However, O'Hare was signed almost a year before Mackay, and McGovern and Mackay were signed on different days. Murphy also declared that the insinuation of Clough not wanting to debate with Revie about his tenure at Leeds United is completely inaccurate.

Murphy was also angered by the portrayal of Clough's drinking and smoking. He insisted that throughout the 1970s Clough was a perfectly fit manager who often actively trained with players at training ground matches, and that the portrayal of him drinking and smoking heavily was a battle he faced approximately 10–20 years after he became manager of Nottingham Forest in 1975.

In the film, Clough is seen preparing Derby's Baseball Ground stadium ahead of the 1968 FA Cup tie against Leeds United and Revie blanking him on the way into the ground.  In fact, the tie was not played at the Baseball Ground but at Leeds' Elland Road ground. 
Brian Clough managed Brighton & Hove Albion for 32 games before he departed in July 1974. The film insinuates that Clough took the Leeds job whilst on holiday in Majorca in 1974, having previously accepted the Brighton job on a handshake and taking the holiday, paid for by the club, before starting work, implying he never actually managed the team. Taylor and Clough are also seen to argue fiercely in Majorca over the Leeds' manager's job offer. There is no record of Clough arguing with Taylor over joining him at Leeds nor a lack of interest in Brighton.

The film says that Leeds lost 1–0 to Luton Town during Clough's reign; this game, played on 7 September 1974, in fact finished 1–1 with Barry Butlin equalising for Luton after Leeds took the lead through Allan Clarke. 
	
The film shows Clough standing outside an entrance to Derby County's Baseball Ground featuring the stylised ram emblem, in 1968; in reality, the latter was not designed until 1971. 
	
The film implies that Derby's 5–0 defeat to Leeds occurred in the 1969–70 season, soon after their promotion to the first division, with Gordon McQueen playing for Leeds United against in the match. In reality the 5–0 result occurred in October 1972, the season after Derby won the 1972 first division championship and the fourth season since their promotion. It was McQueen's first year as a Leeds player; he had not been at the club in 1969.
	
The film shows suspended Billy Bremner sitting next to Clough in the dug-out during a game. In reality, players/coaching staff are not allowed in the dug-out while on suspension.

The film implies Clough re-united with Taylor straight after leaving Elland Road in Sep 1974. However, Taylor managed Brighton & Hove Albion by himself for the 1974/75 and 1975/76 seasons, with Clough joining Nottingham Forest in Jan 1975 where he managed by himself up to the end of 1975/76. Taylor then re-united with Clough professionally in July 1976 at Forest, with the pair winning promotion in 1976/77.

Awards and nominations

References

External links
 
 
 
 
 
 
 Review, Leicester Mercury
Video interviews
 Michael Sheen. talkSPORT Magazine (15 January 2009)
 Andy Harries. Screen Yorkshire (March 2009)

Derby County F.C.
Leeds United F.C.
2009 films
2000s sports comedy-drama films
British sports comedy-drama films
American sports comedy-drama films
2009 independent films
2000s English-language films
Films directed by Tom Hooper
Films with screenplays by Peter Morgan
British association football films
American association football films
Films based on British novels
Films set in Leeds
Films set in the 1960s
Films set in the 1970s
Films set in Brighton
Films set in Yorkshire
Films shot in Leeds
Films shot in Bradford
Films shot in Scarborough
Films shot in West Yorkshire
Films shot in North Yorkshire
Films shot in Yorkshire
Films shot in Mallorca
Films shot in England
Films shot in Spain
British independent films
Left Bank Pictures films
Sony Pictures Classics films
Columbia Pictures films
Brian Clough
Films set in Derbyshire
2000s British films
2000s American films